María Paulina Nieto de Caro (born 13 June 1914) was a Colombian politician. She was elected to the Chamber of Representatives in 1958 as one of the first group of women to enter Congress.

Biography
Nieto de Caro was born in Bogotá in 1914, the daughter of Luis Eduardo Nieto Caballero, a Liberal Party politician.

She also joined the Liberal Party and was a candidate in Cundinamarca in the 1958 parliamentary elections and was elected to the Chamber of Representatives, becoming one of the first group of women to enter Congress.

References

1914 births
People from Bogotá
Colombian Liberal Party politicians
Members of the Chamber of Representatives of Colombia
Year of death unknown
20th-century Colombian women politicians
20th-century Colombian politicians